The 1974 CCHA Men's Ice Hockey Tournament was the third CCHA Men's Ice Hockey Tournament. It was played between March 8 and March 10, 1974, at St. Louis Arena in St. Louis, Missouri. Saint Louis won the tournament, defeating Lake Superior State 8–3 in the championship game.

Conference standings
Note: GP = Games played; W = Wins; L = Losses; T = Ties; PTS = Points; GF = Goals For; GA = Goals Against

Bracket

Semifinals

(1) Lake Superior State vs. Western Michigan

(2) Saint Louis vs. (3) Bowling Green

Third place

(3) Bowling Green vs. Western Michigan

Championship

(1) Lake Superior State vs. (2) Saint Louis

Tournament awards

All-Tournament Team
F John Nestic (Saint Louis)
F Rich Nagai (Bowling Green)
F Charlie Labelle (Saint Louis)
D Mario Faubert (Saint Louis)
D Tom Davies (Lake Superior State)
G Carl Sapinsky (Saint Louis)

References

External links
Central Collegiate Hockey Association

CCHA Men's Ice Hockey Tournament
Ccha tournament